Joseph Perrino (born April 30, 1982) is an American actor. He is best known for his role in the drama film Sleepers in 1996.

Life and career 
Joseph Perrino is an American film, television and stage actor, best known for his roles in the feature film Sleepers and the television series The Sopranos.

Perrino's acting career began with his portrayal of Lorenzo "Shakes" Carcaterra, one of the lead roles in the film Sleepers. His performance reviewed positive reviews; he was nominated for a Young Artist Award for Best Leading Young Actor in a Feature Film and was named a Breakthrough Star by People Magazine.

Perrino went on to work with Anna Paquin, playing her love interest, Ross Epstein, in Tony Goldwyn's A Walk on the Moon. He then played a gang leader named Blade in The Mighty, starring Sharon Stone. Perrino moved on to the indie film The Bumblebee Flies Anyway, playing Mazzo, a terminally ill cancer patient dealing with his last days on earth.

After a hiatus from acting, Perrino returned to appear in the last season of The Sopranos, playing Jason Gervasi, a young mobster.

In 2017, Perrino began work on the STARZ network's hit crime series Power in its 5th season as Vincent Ragni, a boss in the Italian syndicate. According to Power creator Courtney A. Kemp, Perrino made such a favorable impression that the storyline was retooled to keep Perrino's character alive.

Filmography 
 1996 The Juror as Tommy Riggio
 1996 Sleepers as Young Lorenzo 'Shakes' Carcaterra
 1997 Homicide: Life on the Street (TV Series) as Young Johnny Munch
 1998 The Mighty as Tony D [Blade]
 1999 A Walk on the Moon as Ross Epstein
 1999 The Bumblebee Flies Anyway as Mazzo
 2006 The Immaculate Misconception as Joey
 2007 The Sopranos (TV Series) as Jason Gervasi
 2007 The Hit as Tony 'Little Tony'
 2008 Assassination of a High School President as 'Dutch' Middleton
 2010 Law & Order (TV Series) as Parole Officer Jack McKenzie
 2013 Run as Security Guard Owens
 2013 The Family as Joey, Mobster
 2014 Before I Disappear as Ellis
 2014 Blue Bloods (TV Series) as Doorman Sergio
 2015 4 Kings as Unknown
 2016 The Brooklyn Banker as Nick
 2017 Cigarette Soup as Skinner 
 2017 Happy! (TV Series) as Pal Scaramucci
 2018–2020 Power (TV Series) as Vincent Ragni
 2019 It's Bruno! (TV Series) as Mario
 2019 The Wisdom Tooth as Enrico

Awards and nominations
Young Artist Awards
1997: Nominated, "Best Performance in a Feature Film by a Leading Young Actor" - Sleepers

YoungStar Awards
1997: Nominated, "Best Performance by a Young Actor in a Drama Film" - Sleepers

References

External links
 

1982 births
American male child actors
American people of Italian descent
Living people
Male actors from New York City
People from the Bronx